Ceratogomphus triceraticus is a species of dragonfly in the family Gomphidae. It is endemic to South Africa.  Its natural habitat is rivers. It is threatened by habitat loss.

References 

Gomphidae
Insects of South Africa
Insects described in 1963
Taxa named by Boris Balinsky
Taxonomy articles created by Polbot